"Tänker inte alls gå hem" is a song by Swedish dansband Arvingarna. It was performed in Melodifestivalen 2021 and made it to the 13 March final. The song is included on Arvingarna's studio album of the same name, set for release on 13 August 2021.

Charts

References

2021 songs
2021 singles
Arvingarna songs
Melodifestivalen songs of 2021
Songs written by Bobby Ljunggren
Songs written by Nanne Grönvall
Songs written by Thomas G:son
Swedish songs